A point man is a soldier in the front of a military advance.

Point man may also refer to:
 Point Man, a 2019 Vietnam War film
 Point Man, a character in the video game F.E.A.R.
 Pointman, a television series
 Pointman (user interface), device used to control one's avatar